Frank is an unincorporated community in Avery County, North Carolina, United States.  The community is located along US 19-E, between the communities of Minneapolis and Roaring Creek.

See also
 Big Yellow Mountain
 Grassy Ridge Bald
 Little Yellow Mountain
 North Toe River
 Unaka Range

References

Unincorporated communities in Avery County, North Carolina
Unincorporated communities in North Carolina